Filotas Pellios (born 22 March 1953) is a retired Greek footballer.

He is president of the PAOK veterans association.

Honours
PAOK
Greek Cup: 1974
Greek Championship: 1976

References

External links

1953 births
Living people
Footballers from Thessaloniki
Greek footballers
Super League Greece players
PAOK FC players
Greece international footballers
Association football defenders
PAOK FC non-playing staff
People from Thessaloniki (regional unit)